Lassie (also known as The New Adventures of Lassie) is an animated television series produced by  Superprod with the participation of Classic Media. It is a hand-drawn 2D animated update of the classic character by Eric Knight. In the United States, the show was released on Paramount Global's streaming service, Paramount+

Characters

Main characters
 Lassie

The title character of the show, Lassie is a brown and white collie who lives in the Grand Mountain National Park with her owners, the Parker family. Fearless and brave, Lassie will never hesitate to put her life on the line for her family, friends and even random people she may or may not have met before.

For the majority of the episode durations, Lassie will only communicate through her body language and barks, which are only understood by those who know her well. However, she can "talk" to her animal friends from the Red Barn.

 Zoe Parker

Owner of Lassie and daughter of Sarah and Graham. Having inherited her parents' love of nature, Zoe cares a great deal about life in the Park and goes out of her way to protect it, sometimes without thinking and ultimately putting her life at risk. Zoe often takes care of baby animals whenever they need her help. She is normally the one to call Lassie in the day old style, whether there is an emergency or not.

 Chief Ranger Graham Parker

Head of the Grand Mountain National park Ranger Department, Graham, like the rest of his family, is a passionate nature lover and will do anything in his power as Chief Ranger to prevent anyone from damaging the serenity of the Park. Like his wife, Park veterinarian Dr. Sarah Parker, Graham will often worry about the safety of his daughter Zoe before reassuring himself that Zoe is a smart kid who has forgotten more about exploring the beauty of the Park than any tourist has ever learned and as long as she has Lassie by her side, she can never come to any harm.

He once owned a dog that was similar in breed and personality to Lassie, named Shadow, when he was a boy. Sadly, when Graham was eight years old, Shadow was bitten by a snake as he tried to save Graham. Graham, who didn't fully understand at the time, thought he was responsible for the death of his dog and ultimately, even the death of his grandfather, who got sick and died a short while after Shadow, and thus distanced himself from the cabin owned by his grandfather. He later discovered, thanks to Lassie, Zoe and Harvey, that this was not the case and that his grandfather's sickness and death was purely down to something else, more than likely old age. Graham revealed that, whilst he never actually visited the property since the Shadow incident up until the point that he returned to face his fears, he was still keeping up the mortgage on the property and land, meaning the Parker family still owned the property, which ultimately prevented Robert Humphrey from selling it to developers looking to build a leisure hotel.

 Dr. Sarah Parker

As the National Park's resident veterinarian, Sarah takes pride in her work, caring for any animal that may need her medical knowledge. Like her husband and daughter, Sarah is quick to express outrage whenever someone or something is threatening the tranquillity of the Park.

 Harvey Smith

Zoe's best friend. A skilled navigator, like his late father, Jason Smith, Harvey always has a route planned out. He will often follow Zoe and Lassie in their adventures, even if the situation may seem dangerous.

 Mrs. Beth Smith

Mother of Harvey Smith and supposedly a member of staff at the National Park's visitor centre. As Harvey is all she has to remember her husband by, Beth is often concerned whenever Harvey could be in danger. Luckily, she knows that, wherever there's danger, Lassie won't be far.

 Samantha Humphrey

Zoe and Harvey's snooty rival with brown hair. She sometimes throws herself into dangerous situations without thinking anything through.

 Mr. Robert Humphrey

Owner and manager of the Valley Hotel. He is sometimes a minor antagonist, as some of his schemes to drum up tourists can often result in him doing some unscrupulous things, such as telling the driver of an old steam locomotive that he had personally inspected every inch of track on the line he was planning to send a trainload of tourists down to make sure it was safe when, in fact, he hadn't.

 Mrs. Ida Lee

Proprietor of the National Park's general store, 'The Happy Camper', Mrs. Lee may look like any ordinary old lady, but she is far from it, as a couple of poachers learnt when she demonstrated her skills as a rodeo champion by hogtying them whilst they tried to capture a bear cub. She is the owner of Biff the pug, who she often has take the Parker's morning paper to them.

Season 1 
Season 1 aired 26 episodes from 2014 to 2015.

Season 2 
A season 2 with 26 episodes aired as of January 2020.

Unlike the first season, it uses computer-animated characters in front of hand-drawn backgrounds. It was produced by a French studio called Superprod Animation.

These episodes appear on CBS All Access, but are tagged as "Season 1." The copyright on them is 2016.

Broadcast
In the United Kingdom, the show premiered on Pop UK TV on 6 June 2016. In 2016, an official YouTube channel featuring episodes from the series was launched.

In the United States, Lassie debuted on ViacomCBS's streaming service CBS All Access on January 17, 2020. After the service was relaunched with a new name (Paramount+) in 2021, the show was carried over to the ParamountPlus.com site.

References

External links
 Lassie on Paramount+
 

2010s American animated comedy television series
2010s American children's comedy television series
2020s American animated comedy television series
2020s American children's comedy television series
2010s French animated television series
2010s French comedy television series
2020s French animated television series
2020s French comedy television series
2010s German television series
2020s German comedy television series
2014 American television series debuts
2020 American television series endings
2014 French television series debuts
2020 French television series endings
2014 German television series debuts
2020 German television series endings
American computer-animated television series
American children's animated action television series
American children's animated adventure television series
American children's animated comedy television series
American action adventure television series
French computer-animated television series
French children's animated action television series
French children's animated adventure television series
French children's animated comedy television series
German children's animated action television series
German children's animated adventure television series
German children's animated comedy television series
Lassie television series
Cel-shaded animation
Anime-influenced Western animated television series
Animated television series reboots
English-language television shows
Paramount+ original programming
Paramount+ children's programming
TF1 original programming
ZDF original programming
Animated television series about dogs
Animated television series about children
Animated television series about families
Forests in fiction
Television series by Universal Television